The Fox is a lost 1921 American silent Western film starring Harry Carey. Directed by Robert Thornby, it was produced and distributed by Universal Film Manufacturing Company.

Plot
As described in a film magazine, Ol' Santa Fe (Carey) drops off a fast freight train passing through town. He saves an urchin that had been assisting a beggar with a bear from a severe beating and adopts him as his "Pard" (Eason). Securing a job as a porter at the bank Caliente Trust Company, Santa Fe learns that bank president Rufus B. Coulter (Hale) is in league with a bad gang entrenched in the foothills, who have given Sheriff Mart Fraser (Nichols) much trouble. Coulter receives word through the K.C. Kid (Cooper) that a bank examiner is coming to Caliente, so he sends bank employee Dick Farwell (Harron) on a false errand to cover his tracks. Santa Fe goes out to rescue Dick, who has been captured by the outlaws, and runs into the sheriff lost in a sandstorm. Santa Fe proceeds to the rendezvous of the crooks, frees Dick, and returns for help. With the assistance of some U.S. troops he captures the outlaws, exposes Coulter, and then exposes his identity as The Fox, a special agent of the U.S. government sent out to round up the lawless gang. He also wins the love of the sheriff's daughter Annette (Clarke).

Cast
 Harry Carey as Ol' Santa Fe
 C. E. Anderson as Rollins
 Harley Chambers as Hubbs
 Gertrude Claire as Mrs. Farwell
 Betty Ross Clarke as Annette Fraser (credited as Betty Ross Clark)
 George Cooper as K.C. Kid
 B. Reeves Eason Jr. as Pard
 Alan Hale as Rufus B. Coulter
 John Harron as Dick Farwell (credited as Johnny Harron)
 Charles Le Moyne as Black Mike
 George Nichols as Sheriff Mart Fraser
 Gertrude Olmstead as Stella Fraser

Production
Several of the scenes were filmed against the Painted Rocks of the Mojave Desert.

See also
 List of American films of 1921
 Harry Carey filmography

References

External links

 
 
 Lantern slide

1921 films
1921 Western (genre) films
American black-and-white films
Films directed by Robert Thornby
Universal Pictures films
Lost Western (genre) films
Lost American films
1921 lost films
Silent American Western (genre) films
1920s American films